The 1973 Sale and Purchase Agreement was a 20-year agreement pressured by the Shah of Iran on the oil consortium that nullified The Consortium Agreement of 1954 and provided the National Iranian Oil Company with complete control of Iranian petroleum nationalizing the nation’s oil reserves. By 1975, western oil companies complained of the agreement and demanded renegotiation marking the first time in history that oil companies rather than the oil producing nations sought to negotiate an oil contract.

Background
The Shah had ambitions for a "great Persian civilization" in which Iran would one day become the largest oil producer in the world. He used Iran's development to establish himself as a strongman across the Middle East and the Persian Gulf and create an oil oligarchy controlling the price of oil. In the 1960s, the Shah initiated the formation and organization of large oil-exporting countries which would become known as the Organization of the Petroleum Exporting Countries (OPEC). The Shah also sought to terminate the 1954 Consortium Agreement an effort which was finalized with the 1973 Sale and Purchase Agreement. In response to the creation of OPEC, Maurice Bridgman of British Petroleum warned the National Iranian Oil Company that 

According to Dr. Parviz Mina, an expert on Iranian Oil Affairs and previous director of the National Iranian Oil Company,

Result
In the summer of 1973, Iran exploited the supply shortage to double crude oil prices further reducing the power of the oil consortium. Political balance shifted from oil companies to oil producing nations.

References

Petroleum politics
Treaties of Iran
Cold War history of Iran
OPEC